Aap Ki Sewa Mein is a Bollywood film. It was released in 1946. Popular Indian singer Lata Mangeshkar started her Hindi playback singing career with this film.

References

External links
 

1946 films
1940s Hindi-language films
Indian black-and-white films